4 Force is the fourth album from the Japanese pop rock group Every Little Thing, released on March 22, 2001.

This is the first album from Every Little Thing without their former keyboardist, Mitsuru Igarashi, who left in April 2000 to produce songs of other artists, like Dream and the now disbanded day after tomorrow.  In his wake, vocalist Kaori Mochida took over lyric writing, while guitarist Ichirō Itō and a host of additional musicians handled music composition and arrangement.

Track listing

Charts 
Album - Oricon Sales Chart (Japan)

Total Sales:  847,000

References

External links
 4 Force information at Avex Network.
 4 Force information at Oricon.

2001 albums
Every Little Thing (band) albums